The Church of All Saints is a Church of England parish church in Cuddesdon, Oxfordshire. The church is a grade I listed building and it dates from the 12th century.

History
Abingdon Abbey founded the parish in Cuddesdon in about AD 1180. The church dates from the middle of the 12th century.

The chancel was restored in 1849 by Benjamin Ferrey, and the rest of the church was restored between 1851 and 1853 by G. E. Street.

The church was designated as a grade I listed building on 18 July 1963.

Present day
Today, the Church of All Saints is part of the Benefice of Garsington, Cuddesdon and Horspath in the Archdeaconry of Dorchester of the Diocese of Oxford. The church stands in the Liberal Catholic tradition of the Church of England.

Due to its proximately, the church has close links with Ripon College Cuddesdon, an Anglican theological college. The college attends the church's evensong each day.

Notable clergy
 Fr William Fletcher Bishop, later Principal of the College of the Resurrection and Superior of the Community of the Resurrection, served his curacy here from 1933 to 1937
 John Baker, later Bishop of Salisbury, served his curacy here from 1954 to 1957
 Mark Chapman, Professor of the History of Modern Theology at the University of Oxford, non-stipendiary minister of the parish since 2014
 Alastair Redfern, later Bishop of Derby, an honorary curate of the parish from 1983 to 1987
 Mark Santer, later Principal of Westcott House, Cambridge, Bishop of Kensington, and Bishop of Birmingham, served his curacy here from 1963 to 1967
 Michael Scott-Joynt, later Bishop of Winchester, served his curacy here from 1967 to 1970
 Brian Smith, later Bishop of Edinburgh, served his curacy here from 1976 to 1979
 Martin Wharton, later Bishop of Newcastle, was a priest of the parish from 1979 to 1983

List of vicars

 1945–1952: Kenneth Riches, later Bishop of Dorchester and Bishop of Lincoln
 1952–1960: Edward Knapp-Fisher, later Bishop of Pretoria
 1960–1970: Robert Runcie, later Archbishop of Canterbury
 1970–1977: Leslie Houlden, later Professor of Theology at King's College, London
 1977–1985: David Wilcox, later Bishop of Dorking
 2014–2019: Emma Pennington
 2020–present: Karen Charman

References

Bibliography

External links
 Parish website
 A Church Near You entry

Church of England church buildings in Oxfordshire
Grade I listed churches in Oxfordshire
Anglo-Catholic church buildings in Oxfordshire
12th-century church buildings in England